This is a list of top goal-scorers by season in the National Hockey League. Players marked with a dagger (†) are active, while players inducted into the Hockey Hall of Fame are marked with an asterisk (*).

List

See also 

 List of past NHL scoring leaders
 Maurice "Rocket" Richard Trophy

References 

National Hockey League statistical records
Lists of National Hockey League players